Adriana González (born 1991) is an operatic soprano from Guatemala who made an international career.

Career 
González was born in 1991 in Guataemala. She became a member of the opera studio of the Paris Opéra. During her training, she performed roles including Despina in Mozart's Così fan tutte and Zerlina in Don Giovanni. In the 2017/18 season, she became a member of the studio of the Zürich Opera, where she performed as Sepetta in Mozart's La finta giardiniera. After completing her studies she appeared as Pamina in Mozart's Die Zauberflöte , Corinna in Rossini's Il viaggio a Reims and Mimì in Puccini's La bohème. She first appeared as Micaëla in Bizet's Carmen at the Opéra des Nations at the Grand Théâtre de Genève, repeated at the Dutch National Opera in 2022.

References

External links 

 
 
 Adriana González, Soprano operabase.com
 Adriana Gonzalez / Soprano (management) amo-massis.eu 
 Artist of the Week: Adriana Gonzalez operawire.com 26 April 2022

1991 births
Living people
Guatemalan classical musicians
Operatic sopranos
21st-century women opera singers